Tekax, sometimes spelled Tecax (in full, Tekax de Álvaro Obregón), is a small city in the Mexican state of Yucatán, located at 
 in the southernmost part of the state. Tekax (pronounced ) means "Place of the Forests" in the Yucatec Maya language. Tekax was briefly declared the capital of Yucatán in 1845. Tekax is also the name of the surrounding municipality of which the city of Tekax serves as municipal seat of government.

In the census of 2005 Tekax had a population of 23,524. The municipality of Tekax reported a population of 37,454. It has an area of 3,819.61 km² (1,474.76 sq mi) and is the second-largest municipality in geographical area in the state, after Tizimín. The majority of the population in the municipality have Mayan ancestry.

Climate

References
Link to tables of population data from Census of 2005 INEGI: Instituto Nacional de Estadística, Geografía e Informática
Yucatán Enciclopedia de los Municipios de México

External links
Tekax on Yucatan Today

Populated places in Yucatán